John Fitzgerald was the defending champion but did not compete that year.

Aaron Krickstein won in the final 6–4, 6–2 against Andrei Cherkasov.

Seeds
A champion seed is indicated in bold text while text in italics indicates the round in which that seed was eliminated.

  Henri Leconte (first round)
  Andrei Chesnokov (first round)
  Aaron Krickstein (champion)
  Jonas Svensson (first round)
  Darren Cahill (first round)
  Christo van Rensburg (quarterfinals)
  Wally Masur (quarterfinals)
  Magnus Gustafsson (second round)

Draw

External links
 1989 New South Wales Open Draw

Men's Singles